The Battle of Heptonstall occurred in November 1643 during the First English Civil War at Hebden Bridge and Heptonstall, Yorkshire. During the battle, Colonel Bradshaw, a Parliamentarian commander fended off an attack by Sir Francis Mackworth and the Royalists.

Background
By August 1643, the First English Civil War had been going on for a year. The north of England was predominantly under Royalist control after significant victories at the battles of Seacroft Moor and Adwalton Moor. However, the Royalists were embedded in a siege of Hull which they finally lifted in October without success, and were also defeated at Winceby in Lincolnshire, letting the Parliamentarians re-establish their presence in the north.

Battle
It was situated atop a steep hill above Hebden Bridge. A Royalist army out of Halifax, numbering about the same, set out to attack the village under the command of Sir Francis Mackworth. It assembled at Hebden Bridge, a humpback bridge over the River Hebden, which at the time was a swollen torrent after heavy rain.

At the village of Heptonstall, the Parliamentarian garrison was commanded by Colonel Bradshaw, who knew the local terrain, and had set a number of traps which could be triggered if they came under attack. Using the advantage of the hill, he had placed several boulders above the winding track which led from the bridge up to the village. When lookouts posted in the church tower in Heptonstall saw the Royalists slowing climbing the  hill, the rocks were released, and a volley of muskets fired. The attackers were routed, men were knocked off the ridged path, trampled by panicked horses and drowned in the violent river. Most of the remaining Royalists retreated, chased by the garrisoned army and "villagers armed with halberds and pitch-forks".

Aftermath
During the subsequent months, the Parliamentarian garrison evacuated Heptonstall, moving to Burnley and Colne. As a result, the village was captured without resistance in January 1644 when Mackworth returned.

Citations

References

External links

Battles of the English Civil Wars
1643 in England
History of West Yorkshire
Conflicts in 1643
17th century in Yorkshire